Swedish Consumer Agency is a Swedish government agency that answers to the Ministry of Finance. Its director general is also designated Consumer ombudsman (Konsumentombudsmannen, KO).

The agency, with a staff of around 120 located in Karlstad, provides the Swedish general public with consumer affairs assistance, acting in the collective interest of consumers. It is active in the fields of advertising and contract terms, consumer information and product safety. The task of resolving individual consumer disputes, however, is handled by the National Board for Consumer Complaints.

See also
Government agencies in Sweden.

External links
 Official website

Consumer rights agencies
Consumer Agency
Ombudsmen in Sweden